645th Regional Support Group is a United States Army Reserve unit which controls a Combat Sustainment Support Battalion within Michigan.

Units
The brigade is made up of the following units:
 645th Regional Support Group
 645th Headquarters and Headquarters Detachment 
 13th Quartermaster Detachment (Petroleum Liaison Detachment)
 406th Combat Sustainment Support Battalion
 406th Headquarters and Headquarters Company   
 180th Transportation Company (Medium Truck)(Cargo) 
 182nd Transportation Company (Medium Truck)
 301st Quartermaster Company (Water Purification & Distribution)  
 401st Transportation Company (Medium Truck) 
 431st Quartermaster Company (Petroleum Pipeline and Terminal Operations) 
 858th Movement Control Team  
 919th Transportation Company (Cargo Transfer) 
 952nd Quartermaster Company (Petroleum Pipeline and Terminal Operations)

References

Support groups of the United States Army